Shahab may refer to:

Shahab District, a district in Qeshm County, Hormozgan Province, Iran
Mayakovski, Armenia, a town in the Kotayk Province of Armenia, formerly called Shahab
 Shahab (missile), a class of Iranian missiles
 Shahab-1 
 Shahab-2
 Shahab-3
 Shahab-4
 Shahab-5
 Shahab-6 (Toqyān)